Market Square Records was a music promotion and record label company, which operated between 1999 and 2020 based in Buckingham, England.  It released the back catalogues of British folk artists and expanded into other genres such as rock, blues and jazz, the latter on its Dusk Fire Records label, which it launched in 2004.

Artists associated with these two labels include Neil Ardley, Steve Ashley, Kevin Ayers, Kuljit Bhamra, Michael Chapman, Rod Clements, Design, Donovan, Ollie Halsall, Jack The Lad, Bert Jansch, Sonja Kristina, Linda Lewis,  Lindisfarne, Eleanor McEvoy, New Jazz Orchestra, Nirvana, Howard Riley, Steve Tilston, Pierre Tubbs, Peter Ulrich and Norma Winstone.

See also
 List of record labels

References

External links
  Market Square Records
 Dusk Fire Records
 Discogs Market Square
 Discogs Dusk Fire

1999 establishments in England
Blues record labels
British record labels
Folk record labels
IFPI members
Jazz record labels
Music promoters
Record labels established in 1999
Rock record labels
Buckingham